The 1987–88 Major Indoor Soccer League season was the tenth in league history and ended with the San Diego Sockers winning their sixth indoor title in seven years over the Cleveland Force.

Teams

Regular Season Schedule

The 1987-88 regular season schedule ran from November 4, 1987 to April 17, 1988. 
The schedule was lengthened to 56 games per team, the longest to date in MISL history.

Final standings

Playoff teams in bold.

Playoffs

QUARTER-FINALS:   
Minnesota defeated Baltimore, 5-3, 4-2, 1-5, 9-4
Cleveland defeated Dallas, 3-2, 3-6, 5-4 (2OT), 5-2
Kansas City defeated Los Angeles, 9-6, 4-2, 7-5
San Diego defeated Tacoma, 6-2, 3-4 (OT), 7-2, 7-6
SEMI-FINALS:   
Cleveland defeated Minnesota, 7-3, 0-7, 5-4, 5-2, 7-2
San Diego defeated Kansas City, 4-5, 5-4, 6-7(OT), 3-7, 7-1, 6-1, 8-5
CHAMPIONSHIP:   
San Diego defeated Cleveland, 6-5(OT), 6-1, 3-2, 7-4

Scoring leaders

GP = Games Played, G = Goals, A = Assists, Pts = Points

All-MISL Teams

League awards
Most Valuable Player: Erik Rasmussen, Wichita

Scoring Champion: Erik Rasmussen, Wichita

Pass Master: Preki, Tacoma

Defender of the Year: Kevin Crow, San Diego

Rookie of the Year: David Doyle, Kansas City

Newcomer of the Year: Nanad Zigante, Wichita

Goalkeeper of the Year: Zoltan Toth, San Diego

Coach of the Year: Ron Newman, San Diego

Championship Series Most Valuable Player: Hugo Perez, San Diego

Championship Series Unsung Hero: George Fernandez, San Diego

References

External links
 The Year in American Soccer – 1988
 1988 page - Dallas Sidekicks Memorial Archive
 1987-88 summary at The MISL: A Look Back

<noinclude>

Major Indoor Soccer League (1978–1992)